Next Stop Paradise may refer to:

 Next Stop Paradise (1980 film), Danish film
 Next Stop Paradise (1998 film), Romanian film